HD 55151 (HR 2712) is a solitary star located in the circumpolar constellation Volans. With an apparent magnitude of 6.47, it is near the limit of naked eye visibility. The star is located 512 light years away from the Solar System, but is drifting closer with a heliocentric radial velocity of -13 km/s.

HD 55151 has a stellar classification of K0 III, which states that it is an early K-type star that has exhausted hydrogen at its core and left the main sequence. It has twice the Sun's mass, but has expanded to 12 times the Sun's girth. It radiates at 70 solar luminosities from its enlarged photosphere at an effective temperature of 4,824 K, which gives it the orangish-yellow hue of a K-type star. HD 55151 belongs to the thin disk population, and is slightly metal deficient. However, it has a projected rotational velocity that is too low to be measured.

References 

Volans (constellation)
2712
055151
K-type giants
034270
Volantis, 7
Durchmusterung objects